The Women's 15 kilometre free competition of the 2018 Winter Paralympics was held at Alpensia Biathlon Centre,
South Korea. The competition took place on 11 & 12 March 2018.

Medal table

15 km free visually impaired
In the cross-country skiing visually impaired, the athlete with a visual impairment has a sighted guide. The two skiers are considered a team, and dual medals are awarded.

The race was started on 12 March at 12:00.

15 km free standing
The race was started on 12 March at 12:15.

12 km sitting
The race was started on 11 March at 11:15.

See also
Cross-country skiing at the 2018 Winter Olympics

References

Women's 15 kilometre free
Para